Adalbold was the name of:

 Adalbold I, 9th-century bishop of Utrecht
 Adalbold II of Utrecht, 11th-century bishop of Utrecht